Rajpur Legislative Assembly constituency was one of the seventy electoral Uttarakhand Legislative Assembly constituencies of Uttarakhand state in India. It was abolished in 2012 following the delimitation.

Rajpur Legislative Assembly constituency was a part of Tehri Garhwal (Lok Sabha constituency).

Members of Legislative Assembly

See also
 Rajpur Road (Uttarakhand Assembly constituency)

References

Politics of Dehradun
Former assembly constituencies of Uttarakhand
2002 establishments in Uttarakhand
Constituencies established in 2002